English is an upcoming Chinese coming-of-age film directed by Joan Chen, based on the novel by Wang Gang. The story is set in the Cultural Revolution.

Filming wrapped up in Xinjiang in October 2017.

Cast
Wang Zhiwen as Father
Yuan Quan as Mother
Wang Chuanjun as Wang Yajun (Second Prize Wang)
Subinur Anwar as Ahjitai
Huo Siyan 
Qi Yuwu
Liu Lei
Alex Guy/盖帝 as Li Laji
Zhang Zixian

References

Films directed by Joan Chen
Films set in Xinjiang
Films shot in Xinjiang
Films set in the 1970s
Chinese coming-of-age films
Films based on Chinese novels
Films about the Cultural Revolution